Loyola University Andalusia is a private Catholic higher education institution  run by the Spanish Province of the Society of Jesus in Spain with campuses in Seville and Córdoba, It opened it doors for classes in the 2013-14 academic year.

The university includes undergraduate education with an initial list of nine Bachelor's degrees to be taught. A graduate school, called Loyola Leadership School, offers master's degrees related to all of the nine undergraduate programs plus five doctorates.
Loyola University Andalusia conducts student exchanges with top-ranked universities around the world, among them its partner Loyola University Chicago.

History 
The university originated in ETEA, the Faculty of Economic and Business Sciences of Córdoba, a higher education centre founded in 1963. The establishment of Loyola University Andalusia was approved by the Parliament of Andalusia on 23 November 2011. The first promotion enrolled in 2013.

In 2019 a new Campus was opened in Dos Hermanas (Seville). Campus Palmas Altas closed.

Campuses 
The university has two campuses: Campus recently opened in Dos Hermanas (Seville)  and Campus de Córdoba ETEA in Córdoba.

Faculties and schools 
The university contains three undergraduate faculties and schools and two postgraduate schools:
           
Undergraduate
Faculty of Economic and Business Sciences
Faculty of Social, Law and Education Sciences 
Higher Technical School of Engineering
Postgraduate
Loyola Leadership School
Doctoral School

See also
 List of Jesuit sites

References

External links
Official website

Educational institutions established in 2010
Catholic universities and colleges in Spain
Jesuit universities and colleges in Spain
2010 establishments in Spain
Universities and colleges in Spain
Universities in Andalusia